Rolf Huser (born 5 June 1971) is a Swiss racing cyclist. He rode in the 1999 Tour de France.

Major results

1996
10th Overall Tour de l'Avenir
1998
5th Overall Tour of Austria
6th Rund um den Henninger Turm
7th Tour de Berne
8th Overall Tour de Luxembourg
1999
7th Overall Deutschland Tour
9th Giro del Piemonte
2000
7th Paris–Bourges
2002
7th Stausee-Rundfahrt Klingnau

References

External links

1971 births
Living people
Swiss male cyclists
Place of birth missing (living people)